Sheillah Molelekwa (born November 26, 1992) is a Botswana beauty pageant titleholder who was crowned Miss Universe Botswana 2012 and represented Botswana in the 2012 Miss Universe pageant.

Miss Universe Botswana 2012
Sheillah Molelekwa was crowned Miss Universe Botswana 2012 during the annual competition held at the Gaborone International Convention Center (GICC) on October 14, 2012, besting 11 other contestants.  During the contest, she modeled a national costume with a beaded headdress and a whip, which made Time magazine's list of Most Bizarre National Costumes.

Personal life
After growing up with her grandmother in a small village, she moved to Gaborone to live with her mother.  She is studied Accounting at Botho College in hopes of becoming an auditor.

References

External links
 

Living people
Botswana beauty pageant winners
People from Gaborone
Miss Universe 2012 contestants
1992 births